Walter Bergmann may refer to:
 (1864–1950), German infantry general
Walter Bergmann (1902–1988), German-born harpsichord and recorder player and music editor
Walter Bergman (born Walter Bergmann, 1913–1986), South African numismatist
Walter Bergmann (1905–?), a Nazi who played a role in the Stennes revolt

References